Guido Ulrich Buchwald (born 24 January 1961) is a German former professional football player. Throughout his career he played as a defender. He is currently director of football of Stuttgarter Kickers.

The best game of Buchwald's career was the final of the 1990 FIFA World Cup victory for West Germany against Argentina where he effectively marked Diego Maradona for almost the entire match, earning him the nickname "Diego". He was also part of Germany's disappointing 1994 FIFA World Cup campaign and collected in his career 76 caps.

Career
Buchwald began his professional football career in 1983 with VfB Stuttgart. He played 325 games in the German Bundesliga for this club, scoring 28 goals. The low-point of his career was in 1986 when coach Franz Beckenbauer did not include him in his team for the World Cup in Mexico. He was however part of the squad which won the World Cup in Italy four years later.

The same year Stuttgart lost the final of the German Cup against Bayern Munich and in 1989 the final of the UEFA Cup was also lost, but they managed to win two German championships (1984, 1992).

His personal highlight in his Bundesliga career was on the last day of play in the 1991–92 season, when he scored the deciding goal against Bayer Leverkusen that won Stuttgart the match and the Championship – just six minutes before the games' end.

In 1994, he signed with the Japanese team Urawa Red Diamonds before returning to Germany in 1998 to help Karlsruher SC avoid relegation. He could not save the team and after one more season playing in the second division he retired but stayed with the club as a director of sports.

After retirement
After a stop with the Stuttgarter Kickers (again as director of sports) he went back to Japan where he was managing his old club. He led his team to the "closing" championship.
In 2005, won the title on Emperor's Cup.
In 2006, he won the title on both J-League and Emperor's Cup.

Buchwald then returned to Germany to become manager of Alemannia Aachen.
After five months on duty he was fired by club management on 26 November 2007.

On 1 November 2010, Buchwald returned to the Stuttgarter Kickers as a member of the board responsible for the first team. He took over as interim manager in November 2012 after the sacking of Dirk Schuster, before relinquishing this duty a month later when Gerd Dais was appointed.

Career statistics

Club

1 Including 1 match and 1 goal in 1992 DFB-Supercup.

International

Coaching

Honours

As a player 
VfB Stuttgart
 Bundesliga: 1983–84, 1991–92
 DFL-Supercup: 1992

Germany
 FIFA World Cup: 1990

Individual
 kicker Bundesliga Team of the Season: 1989–90, 1993–94
 J.League Best XI: 1995, 1996

As a manager 
Urawa Red Diamonds
 J.League Division 1: 2006
 Emperor's Cup: 2005, 2006
 Xerox Super Cup: 2006

Individual
 J.League Manager of the Year: 2006

References

External links
 
 
 
 
 

1961 births
Living people
1990 FIFA World Cup players
1994 FIFA World Cup players
Expatriate footballers in Japan
Expatriate football managers in Japan
FIFA World Cup-winning players
Footballers at the 1984 Summer Olympics
German expatriate sportspeople in Japan
German footballers
German expatriate footballers
German football managers
Germany international footballers
Germany under-21 international footballers
Bundesliga players
2. Bundesliga players
Karlsruher SC players
Olympic footballers of West Germany
West German footballers
Stuttgarter Kickers players
UEFA Euro 1984 players
UEFA Euro 1988 players
UEFA Euro 1992 players
J1 League players
Urawa Red Diamonds players
J1 League managers
Urawa Red Diamonds managers
VfB Stuttgart players
Alemannia Aachen managers
Stuttgarter Kickers managers
Footballers from Berlin
Association football defenders
3. Liga managers
Recipients of the Order of Merit of Baden-Württemberg